Gaz de France Stars, also known by its non-sponsored name, the Hasselt Cup, was a women's tennis tournament held in Hasselt, Belgium. Held from 2004 till 2006, this WTA Tour event was a Tier III-tournament and was played on indoor hardcourts.

Past finals

Singles

Doubles

See also 
List of tennis tournaments

External links 
Official Site

 
Tennis tournaments in Belgium
Indoor tennis tournaments
Hard court tennis tournaments
WTA Tour
Recurring sporting events established in 2004
Recurring events disestablished in 2006
Defunct tennis tournaments in Europe
Defunct sports competitions in Belgium